The Carnegie Center for Art & History, within the Downtown Historic District of New Albany, Indiana, is a contemporary art gallery and local history museum.  The building was initially built as a Carnegie Library, first opened on March 2, 1904, with 11,125 total books.  It is of Beaux-Arts architecture style.  It was used as a library until 1969, when the new New Albany-Floyd County Public Library was built. After a $1.2 million renovation in 1998, the name was changed to the Carnegie Center for Art & History to better reflect its mission and library heritage. In 2015, total attendance was 26,690 and Carnegie Center staff presented 107 programs to participants of all ages. The Carnegie Center has a full-time staff of four employees, which includes a Director, Curator, Coordinator of Public Programming and Outreach and First Impression Receptionist and a part-time maintenance person. Three part-time trained volunteers come in weekly to manage a collection of over 5,000 objects. All exhibits and programs are offered free of charge to the public.

In addition to changing exhibits of contemporary art, the Carnegie Center has two permanent exhibitions.  The first is entitled "Ordinary People, Extraordinary Courage: Men and Women of the Underground Railroad," which includes an interactive multimedia program.  The exhibit's brochure states:  "This unique exhibit draws the national phenomenon of the Underground Railroad into sharp focus by revealing the contributions of ordinary people from New Albany and Southern Indiana, whose courageous acts helped overthrow the institution of slavery." The second permanent exhibit is entitled "Remembered: The Life of Lucy Higgs Nichols".

See also
 List of attractions and events in the Louisville metropolitan area
 National Register of Historic Places listings in Floyd County, Indiana

References

Official website
Indiana Historical Bureau Marker Dedication - Three New Albany State Historical Marker Dedications

Library buildings completed in 1902
Carnegie libraries in Indiana
National Register of Historic Places in Floyd County, Indiana
Buildings and structures in New Albany, Indiana
Museums in Floyd County, Indiana
Art museums and galleries in Indiana
History museums in Indiana
Former library buildings in the United States
Art museums established in 1971
Historic district contributing properties in Indiana
Libraries established in 1904